Leza is a town and municipality located in the province of Álava, in the Basque Country, northern Spain.

References

External links
 LEZA in the Bernardo Estornés Lasa - Auñamendi Encyclopedia 
 Leza official website 

Municipalities in Álava